The State bank was established by government of Mongolia from the assets of 2 failed banks, Anod Bank and Zoos Bank, of Mongolia in November 24, 2009. It has about 201 to 500 employees. In July 2013, the government of Mongolia combined the 5th-largest bank, Savings Bank, with the State Bank after Savings Bank failed due to a large bad  loan to its parent company, Just Group, and previous losses from acquiring Mongol Post Bank, at a cost to the state of $122 million. All 503 branches and 1.7 million customers were transferred to State Bank.

Locations
 Headquarters: Baga toiruu 7/1, 1st khoroo, Chingeltei District, Ulaanbaatar

See also
 Bank of Mongolia
 Zoos Bank

Notes

External links
 http://www.statebank.mn/

Banks of Mongolia
Banks established in 2009
Companies based in Ulaanbaatar